Castle Hill Lunatic Asylum was Australia's first official institution which provided care for the mentally ill. Established by Lachlan Macquarie in May 1811, it operated until 1826. It was housed in a two-storey stone building, previously a granary, which also served as a barracks at one time.

References

Further reading 

Psychiatric hospitals in Australia
Defunct hospitals in Australia
Hospitals established in 1811
Hospitals in Sydney
1811 establishments in Australia